MIT Academy of Engineering (MIT AOE) is an autonomous engineering college affiliated with the Savitribai Phule Pune University, India and accredited by NAAC with "A" Grade in 2014 & NBA Accredited. It was established in the year 1999 and is approved and accredited by AICTE. The college provides both undergraduate and postgraduate programs.

Academics
MIT Academy of Engineering offers undergraduate/postgraduate Engineering and Management (Btech & Mtech) programs in several disciplines:

Undergraduate programs
	                                          Intake

Chemical Engineering 	 (B. Tech.)                                            60

Civil Engineering 	    (B. Tech.)                                                           60

Computer Engineering 	  (B. Tech.)                              120

Electronics and Telecommunication Engineering 	     120(B. Tech.)

Electronics Engineering 	   (B. Tech.)                                       60

Information Technology 	    (B. Tech.)                                       60

Mechanical Engineering 	  (B. Tech.)                                  180

Mechanical Engineering (Direct SE) 	 (B. Tech.)                        60

Post-Graduate programs
 M.TECH. Computers                                  18
 M.TECH. Electronics(VLSI & Embedded Systems)       18
 M.TECH. Mechanical                                 18

Library
The MIT AOE Central Library started operation from the year 1999 with a collection covering computer, electronics, chemical and E&TC engineering, mechanical engineering, information technology disciplines. 
The built-up area of the library is 9578.53 sq. ft. (905 sq. mt).

References

External links
MITAOE Official Website
 

Engineering colleges in Maharashtra
Universities and colleges in Pune
Colleges affiliated to Savitribai Phule Pune University
Educational institutions established in 1999
1999 establishments in Maharashtra